The Kreisliga Württemberg (English: District league Württemberg) was the highest association football league in the German state of Württemberg from 1919 to 1923. The league was disbanded with the introduction of the Bezirksliga Württemberg-Baden in 1923.

Overview

Predecessor
From 1907, four regional leagues were formed within the structure of the Southern German football championship, in a move to improve the organisation of football in Southern Germany, these being:
 Ostkreis-Liga, covering Bavaria
 Nordkreis-Liga, covering Hesse
 Südkreis-Liga, covering Württemberg, Baden and Alsace
 Westkreis-Liga, covering the Palatinate, Lorraine and the southern Rhine Province

In 1908, a first Südkreis-Liga (English: Southern District League) was established, consisting of ten clubs and playing a home-and-away season. With the outbreak of the First World War, league football came to a halt and, during the war, games were only played on a limited level.

Post-First World War
With the collapse of the German Empire in 1918, no Württemberg championship was played in 1918-19 but football returned to a more organised system in 1919.

Southern Germany, now without the Alsace region, which had to be returned to France, was sub-divided into ten Kreisligas, these being:
 Kreisliga Hessen      
 Kreisliga Nordbayern  
 Kreisliga Nordmain    
 Kreisliga Odenwald    
 Kreisliga Pfalz       
 Kreisliga Saar        
 Kreisliga Südbayern  
 Kreisliga Südmain     
 Kreisliga Südwest     
 Kreisliga Württemberg

The Südkreis-Liga was split into three regional competitions, Württemberg, Odenwald and Südwest, each with ten clubs. The three league winners advanced to the Southern championship. This system applied for the 1919-20 and 1920-21 season.

In 1921-22, the Kreisliga Württemberg was split into two groups of eight, increasing the number of tier-one clubs in Württemberg to 16. The two league winners then played a final to determine the Württemberg champion, which in turn advanced to a Baden-Württemberg championship final against the Südwest champion. The Odenwald champion was not part of this series but rather played a Rhine championship. This "watering down" of Württemberg football lasted for only one season, in 1922-23, the number of top clubs was reduced to eight clubs in a single division, with a Baden-Württemberg final against the Südwest champion once more.

In 1923, a league reform which was decided upon in Darmstadt, Hesse, established the Southern German Bezirksligas which were to replace the Kreisligas. The best four teams each from the Südwest and Württemberg were admitted to the new Bezirksliga Württemberg-Baden. The four clubs from Württemberg were:
 Stuttgarter Kickers
 SV Feuerbach
 VfR Heilbronn
 SC Stuttgart

National success
The clubs from the Kreisliga Württemberg were not particularly successful in this era and none managed to qualify for the German championship.

Baden-Württemberg championship
Played in 1922 and 1923, these were the finals:
 1922:
 Württemberg final: Sportfreunde Stuttgart - Stuttgarter Kickers 1-0 / 3-2
 Baden-Württemberg final: Sportfreunde Stuttgart - Karlsruher FV 1-0 / 1-1
 1923:
 Baden-Württemberg final: 1. FC Pforzheim - Stuttgarter Kickers 3-0 / 1-1

Southern German championship
Qualified teams and their success:
 1920:
 SC Stuttgart, Group stage
 1921:
 Stuttgarter Kickers, Group stage
 1922:
 Sportfreunde Stuttgart, Semi-finals
 1923:
 Stuttgarter Kickers, not qualified

Winners and runners-up of the Kreisliga Württemberg

Placings in the Kreisliga Württemberg 1919-23

References

Sources
 Fussball-Jahrbuch Deutschland  (8 vol.), Tables and results of the German tier-one leagues 1919-33, publisher: DSFS
 Kicker Almanach,  The yearbook on German football from Bundesliga to Oberliga, since 1937, published by the Kicker Sports Magazine
 Süddeutschlands Fussballgeschichte in Tabellenform 1897-1988  History of Southern German football in tables, publisher & author: Ludolf Hyll

External links
 The Gauligas  Das Deutsche Fussball Archiv 
 German league tables 1892-1933  Hirschi's Fussball seiten
 Germany - Championships 1902-1945 at RSSSF.com

1
1919 establishments in Germany
1923 disestablishments in Germany
Football competitions in Baden-Württemberg
20th century in Baden-Württemberg
Southern German football championship
Sports leagues established in 1919
Ger